Erik Valnes (born 19 April 1996) is a Norwegian cross-country skier.

At the 2018 Junior World Championships (U23) he won the gold medal in the sprint, and also competed in the 15 km event.

He made his World Cup debut in December 2017 in Lillehammer, also breaking the top 30-barrier with a 27th place in the sprint there.

He represents the sports club Bardufoss og Omegn IF.

Cross-country skiing results
All results are sourced from the International Ski Federation (FIS).

Olympic Games
1 medal (1 gold)

Distance reduced to 30 km due to weather conditions.

World Championships
2 medal – (1 gold, 1 silver)

World Cup

Season standings

Individual podiums
1 victory – (1 ) 
10 podiums – (7 , 3 )

Team podiums
 3 victories – (1 , 2 ) 
 3 podiums – (1 , 2 )

References

External links
 
 
 
 

1996 births
Living people
People from Målselv
Norwegian male cross-country skiers
FIS Nordic World Ski Championships medalists in cross-country skiing
Cross-country skiers at the 2022 Winter Olympics
Olympic cross-country skiers of Norway
Medalists at the 2022 Winter Olympics
Olympic gold medalists for Norway
Olympic medalists in cross-country skiing
Sportspeople from Troms og Finnmark
21st-century Norwegian people